101st Logistic Brigade (101 Log Bde) is a logistic brigade within 3rd (United Kingdom) Division of the British Army, formed from the Combat Service Support Group in 1999. The brigade is held in high readiness and is described as a "vanguard support brigade".

History
In 1999, Combat Service Support Group (United Kingdom) was formed under operational command of 3rd (United Kingdom) Mechanised Division.

Under the LANDmark reorganisation from 2002, the group was redesignated as 101st Logistic Brigade and placed under Force Troops Command, but remained under operational command of the 3rd (UK) Mechanised Division still.  Under the Army 2020 plan, the Brigade re-subordinated from HQ Force Troops Command to 3rd (United Kingdom) Division permanently on 1 December 2014.

Future 
Under the Future Soldier programme, the brigade will be redesignated as the 101st Operational Sustainment Brigade.  The brigade's headquarters will move to Imphal Barracks, York in future, and its units designated as 'Combat Support units'.  The future role of the brigade has been described as follows: "101st Operational Sustainment Brigade will provide the 3rd Division's logistics and equipment support.  It will include the Army's heavy equipment transport and powerpack repair capability; ensuring the armoured BCTs can deploy rapidly and sustain high intensity operations."

List of structures

References 

101
Military units and formations established in 1999
Logistics units and formations of the British Army
Organisations based in Hampshire
1999 establishments in the United Kingdom